Dragana Đorđević (born 2 June 1914, date of death unknown) was a Yugoslav gymnast. She competed at the 1936 Summer Olympics and the 1948 Summer Olympics.

References

1914 births
Year of death missing
Yugoslav female artistic gymnasts
Olympic gymnasts of Yugoslavia
Gymnasts at the 1936 Summer Olympics
Gymnasts at the 1948 Summer Olympics
Place of birth missing